The Rising Auto or Feifan R7 is a fully-electric mid-size luxury crossover SUV announced in 2021 by SAIC Motor under the Rising Auto brand and on sale since 2022.

Overview 

The R7 was originally previewed by the ES33 concept in 2021 during the Shangai Auto Show in April. The ES33 concept was introduced with the newly announced "R" brand as an electric vehicle brand departing from Roewe. The R brand later received a Chinese name Feifan (飞凡) and even later, a full English name Rising Auto.

The Rising Auto R7 is a 5-door, 5-seater crossover SUV with a sporting roofline. It is a "crossover coupe" with swappable battery and 544 hp. The top of the trim variant R7 has two electric motors with a combined power of 400 kW (544 hp) and 700 Nm. There is also an rear-wheel-drive version with 340 horses. The R7 also has a swappable ternary (NMC) battery on board offering 600 km of range. Additionally, there are versions without swappable batteries. The drag coefficient of the Rising Auto R7 is 0.238 Cd.

The interior features a 43-inch triple screen setup with the main screen of 15.05 inches. The R7 also features an AR-HUD system from Huawei with a 70-inch display area. The R7 features 33 sensors around the vehicle, including an optional LIDAR from Luminar Technologies (LAZR) powered by NVIDIA Orin. The main feature of this LIDAR is the 500-meter detection distance.

References 

Electric concept cars
Luxury crossover sport utility vehicles
Production electric cars
Cars introduced in 2021